Berosus sayi is a species of hydrophilid beetles native to the United States. It is a synonym of Berosus striatus, which was originally described by Thomas Say in 1825, and females can be characterized by a small tooth on the suture near the apex of each elytron.

References

Further reading

External links

 

Hydrophilinae
Articles created by Qbugbot
Beetles described in 1999